Amnios is a video game for the Amiga published in 1991 by Psygnosis. It is a top-down, scrolling, multidirectional shooter set on ten planets across ten levels.

Reviews

External links 
Amnios at Lemon Amiga
Amnios at Amiga Hall of Light

1991 video games
Amiga games
Amiga-only games
Psygnosis games
Multidirectional shooters
Single-player video games
Video games developed in the United Kingdom